Sobremonte Department is a department of Córdoba Province in Argentina.

The provincial subdivision has a population of about 4,531 inhabitants in an area of 3,307 km², and its capital city is San Francisco del Chañar, which is located around 930 km from Buenos Aires.

Settlements
Caminiaga
Chuña Huasi
Pozo Nuevo
San Francisco del Chañar

Departments of Córdoba Province, Argentina